Sune Wretling (2 January 1939 – 26 April 2007) was a Swedish ice hockey player. He competed in the men's tournament at the 1960 Winter Olympics.

References

External links
 

1939 births
2007 deaths
Swedish ice hockey players
Olympic ice hockey players of Sweden
Ice hockey players at the 1960 Winter Olympics
People from Hallstahammar Municipality
Sportspeople from Västmanland County